Ikechukwu Gabriel is a Nigerian professional footballer who plays as a defender for Bayelsa United.

International career
In January 2014, coach Stephen Keshi, invited him to be included in the Nigeria 23-man team for the 2014 African Nations Championship. He helped the team defeat Zimbabwe to a third-place finish by a goal to nil.

References

Living people
Nigeria A' international footballers
2014 African Nations Championship players
Nigerian footballers
Place of birth missing (living people)
Association football defenders
Year of birth missing (living people)
Sportspeople from Warri
Bayelsa United F.C. players